Garland is a town in Sampson County, North Carolina, United States. The population was 625 at the 2010 census.

History 
The community was settled in about 1888 and named Sloan's Crossing. It was incorporated in 1907 as Garland, after U.S. Attorney General Augustus Hill Garland.

Geography

Demographics

2020 census

As of the 2020 United States census, there were 595 people, 290 households, and 185 families residing in the town.

2000 census
As of the census of 2000, there were 808 people, 276 households, and 203 families residing in the town. The population density was 751.2 people per square mile (288.9/km2). There were 313 housing units at an average density of 291.0 per square mile (111.9/km2). The racial makeup of the town was 48.64% White, 33.79% African American, 0.62% Native American, 15.59% from other races, and 1.36% from two or more races. Hispanic or Latino of any race were 18.56% of the population.

There were 276 households, out of which 32.6% had children under the age of 18 living with them, 46.4% were married couples living together, 23.2% had a female householder with no husband present, and 26.4% were non-families. 22.8% of all households were made up of individuals, and 12.0% had someone living alone who was 65 years of age or older. The average household size was 2.78 and the average family size was 3.20.

In the town, the population was spread out, with 25.1% under the age of 18, 10.9% from 18 to 24, 25.7% from 25 to 44, 22.2% from 45 to 64, and 16.1% who were 65 years of age or older. The median age was 34 years. For every 100 females, there were 91.9 males. For every 100 females age 18 and over, there were 90.3 males.

The median income for a household in the town was $29,000, and the median income for a family was $29,145. Males had a median income of $20,288 versus $17,417 for females. The per capita income for the town was $13,533. About 24.4% of families and 25.7% of the population were below the poverty line, including 36.6% of those under age 18 and 24.4% of those age 65 or over.

Notable interests
 Austin Brown was elected as the youngest commissioner in the towns history in November 2017 at the age of 22.He was later elected as the towns youngest Mayor Pro Tem. In 2021 Brown was elected Mayor of the Town and will serve a 2-year term ending in 2023. 
 Winifred Hill Murphywas appointed in February 2012, becoming the first female and the first African American who has served as mayor for the town.  Murphy was elected in November 2013 to serve another four-year term. She was reelected in 2019 and served a 2-year term.  
 Garland is home to Cashwell Farms, a 100-year-old farm that currently serves as a working blueberry farm. Cashwell Farms is a two-time (2005 and 2006) North Carolina State Fair Winner in both Jams and Chicken categories.
 The Garland Shirt Company, the town's major employer, produces shirts and other assorted apparel items for Brooks Brothers.
 The Garland Rotary Parade & Festival was held the first Saturday in October on Front St. with food, games, shops, and music until 2012.  After the Garland Rotary Club lost its charter in 2013, the town organized a Community Day with a parade and festival beginning on October 4, 2014. The day was filled with street and food vendors, local entertainment, and amusement games for the children.  A street dance was held in the evening, featuring a local band.
 The South River Presbyterian Church was added to the National Register of Historic Places in 1996.

References

Works cited

External links
 Cashwell Farms

Towns in North Carolina
Towns in Sampson County, North Carolina